Mohammad Reza Niknahal is an Iranian footballer who plays for Naft Tehran in the Iranian Premier League.

References

Living people
Naft Tehran F.C. players
Iranian footballers
1985 births
Association football forwards